The shortlisted nominees for the 2009 Governor General's Awards for Literary Merit were announced on October 14, and winning titles were announced on November 17 (see 2009 in poetry). Each winner will receive a cheque for $25,000 and a copy of their book bound by Montreal bookbinder Lise Dubois.

English

French

References

External links
Governor General's Awards

Governor General's Awards
Governor General's Awards
Governor General's Awards